Climax is a small town in Decatur County, Georgia, United States. The town was named "Climax" because it is located at the highest point of the railroad between Savannah, Georgia, and the Chattahoochee River. The population was 280 at the 2010 census.

History
Climax was platted in 1833, and named for its lofty elevation. The Georgia General Assembly incorporated the place in 1905 as the "Town of Climax", with the municipal corporate limits extending in a one-half mile radius from the town's central water well.

Geography

Climax is located in eastern Decatur County at  (30.877194, -84.431975). It sits on the crest of Curry Hill, a  escarpment that forms the southwestern side of the Flint River valley.

U.S. Route 84 passes through Climax, leading west  to Bainbridge, the Decatur County seat, and east  to Cairo.

Demographics

As of the census of 2000, there were 297 people, 116 households, and 78 families residing in the town. The racial makeup of the town was 56.90% White, 41.08% African American, 0.34% Native American, 0.34% from other races, and 1.35% from two or more races. Hispanic or Latino of any race were 3.37% of the population.

There were 116 households, out of which 31.0% had children under the age of 18 living with them, 50.0% were married couples living together, 13.8% had a female householder with no husband present, and 31.9% were non-families. 31.0% of all households were made up of individuals, and 18.1% had someone living alone who was 65 years of age or older.  The average household size was 2.56 and the average family size was 3.27.

In the town, the population was spread out, with 30.0% under the age of 18, 8.4% from 18 to 24, 22.6% from 25 to 44, 21.9% from 45 to 64, and 17.2% who were 65 years of age or older.  The median age was 35 years. For every 100 females, there were 85.6 males.  For every 100 females age 18 and over, there were 80.9 males.

The median income for a household in the town was $26,250, and the median income for a family was $33,250. Males had a median income of $30,000 versus $17,083 for females. The per capita income for the town was $11,666.  About 9.6% of families and 9.8% of the population were below the poverty line, including 13.2% of those under the age of eighteen and 6.8% of those 65 or over.

Swine Time Festival 
Climax's annual festival is held on the first Saturday after Thanksgiving. The event is attended by 35,000 people annually, a large number in light of Climax's sub-300 population. Contests and events include best-dressed pig, corn shucking, hog calling, eating chitterlings, pig racing, syrup making, baby crawling, and the great greased pig chase. The festival is kicked off with a parade down Main Street that leads up to the event grounds. There is also a beauty contest for different age groups where the winner is crowned Miss and Little Miss Swine Time.

References

External links
Swine Time Festival
Climax historical marker

Cities in Georgia (U.S. state)
Cities in Decatur County, Georgia